The following is the list of characters from the Japanese magical girl anime television series Ojamajo Doremi.

Ojamajos (Witch Apprentices)
 
 
 Doremi is the main protagonist of the series. A lively, longing for love, a little confused, and kind girl who always cares about the people around her. She is very interested in witches and magical things. At first she hoped to use magic to give herself the courage to confess to the person she liked, and eventually she learned that this can be achieved even without magic. She often proclaims herself to be "the unluckiest girl in the whole world" when things do not go her way. Her favorite food is steak, but in the series she has almost failed to eat it. Her favorite instrument is a piano, but because of the shadow of her childhood performance failure, she also has a complicated mood about piano. 
 Her theme color is pink.

 
 
 Hazuki is a passive, gentle, and smart girl. She is a rich family girl and Doremi's childhood friend. She dared not express her thoughts to her parents because she was afraid of their sadness even though she had her own opinion. Finally she overcome this problem. She likes lame jokes and is very afraid of ghosts. She has a talent for playing the violin and composing music. At the end of the story, she decided to go to Karen Girls High School to realize her violin dream.
 Her theme color is orange.

 
 
 Aiko is a transfer student from Osaka. She is a tomboy with vigorous personality, reliable, and good at sports. Her parents are divorced, so she lives with her father. She loves both her parents very much and wishes for them to get back together. Finally with the efforts of her and the others, her parents regrouped after introspect and solving their problems. Her favorite instrument is a harmonica because it was bought for her by her parents before they divorced. Her favorite food is Takoyaki (chocolate chip cookies in the English version).
 Her theme color is sky blue.

 
 
 Onpu is a famous Japanese child idol who became a witch apprentice of Majoruka, a rival of Majorika. She is a little headstrong, closed heart and abused forbidden magic to change the minds of others because she has an amulet to protect her from being backlashed at first, but becomes kind and selfless by spending time with Doremi and the others then join them. She eager to do well in everything especially her acting job. She lives with her mother, who used to be an idol herself before an accident traumatized her. Her favorite instrument is a flute, and favorite food is Crêpe.
 In Japanese, her name Onpu means "musical note".
 Her theme color is purple.

 
 
 Momoko is a Japanese-American transfer student from New York City and was the apprentice of the late Majo Monroe. At the beginning of Motto, she only speaks English and is unfamiliar with the Japanese culture, but she can use a translator intercom with her patissiére uniform with which she can fluently understand and speak Japanese. She becomes friends with Doremi and the others, who teach her how to speak Japanese. She has a straightforward personality. She is proficient in baking and her dream is to open a pastry shop. Her favorite instrument is a guitar.
 Her theme color is yellow.

 

 Hana is a witch baby born from a large light blue rose in the Witch Queen's Garden that produces a new baby every 100 years as the successor to the throne. Hana is given to Doremi and the others to be cared for after she stumbles across her. In Sharp, Doremi, Hazuki, Aiko, and Onpu serve as Hana's mothers (especially Doremi). Then in Motto, Momoko joined them also as Hana's mother. Although she is just a baby, she has powerful magic. Because of this incident, her crystal ball broke into pieces, which the source of magic used by a witch, so she also became a witch apprentice in this period.
 Her theme color is white.

 
 
 Pop is Doremi's younger sister. She attends Sonatine Kindergarten for the first half of the series and then moves on to Misora First Elementary School. Pop accidentally discovers Doremi's magical powers in the first season and as such becomes a witch apprentice as well. She acts older than her age and is more responsible than her older sister.
 Her theme color is red.

Witch World
The Witch World is referred to as the Lunaverse in the 4Kids English dub. In here  means witch.

Witches
 
 
 A witch that owns and unsuccessfully manages the MAHODO. This short-tempered witch dubs herself  and lives in the human world. Caught by Doremi, she was cursed and transformed into a magic frog. Majo Rika later gains more witch apprentices, each a bit of a handful for her, thus leading her to call them (especially Doremi) . In reality, she does care for them and thinks of them as her daughters. In the end, she goes back to the Witch World with Hana and the fairies. Her crystal used to be a lime-green sphere, but after being turned into a witch frog, it became a lilac sphere.

 
 
 Dela is the Witch World's tax collector. She visits the MAHODO often to collect monthly and overdue payments. Her entrances usually involve coming out of various objects like closets, from behind doors, or even from inside vases and cups. In the dubbed version, she has an accordion playing in the background while she sings her entrance greeting; in the Japanese version, her singing is more mystical and softly sung. She also shows up occasionally bearing deliveries for the girls, like their Witch Apprentice Certificates (Certiwands), or information regarding their tests. Dela rarely gives anything away (even information) without a price.

 
 
 The Queen of the Witch World, who hides her face behind a veil. She watches over the apprentices as they progress, also using her power to provide Hana with the ability to transform. At the end of the fourth season, she is revealed to be Ms. Yuki, who had been following Doremi's potential and putting her on the path to become a great witch.

 
 
 The Queen's royal attendant. She also drives the Queen's carriage and is a loyal servant and apprentice.

  and 
 Mota 
 Motamota 
 Mota and Motamota are a witch duo that serves as the proctors for the apprentice examinations. While they both speak very slowly, Mota's thin figure is in stark contrast to Motamota's plump body type. During the second season, they took care of two babies named Deki and Dekipaki. They examined the witch apprentices in season 1 and Pop from season 2 onward.

 
 
 Majo Rika's rival and the main antagonist of Season 1. She first appeared when Majo Rika lost the Maho-do to Dela in a heated card game, who then sold the shop to Majo Ruka. To help her out in the shop, Majo Ruka turned a bat and a rat into her servants. After Majo Rika got her shop back, Majo Ruka retreated to a beach where Onpu happened to discover her in the act of using magic, causing her to turn into a witch frog. She then makes Onpu her witch apprentice. During the 2nd and 3rd season, Majo Rika and Majo Ruka are on mostly good terms. By season 4, she returned to her original form.

 
 
 Majo Don is the head of the Witch World's market exchange.

 
 
 The head doctor of the Witch World, who manages the health examinations that Hana is required to pass in Ojamajo Doremi Sharp.

 
 
 Majo Miller is the head of the Witch World's kindergarten.

 
 
 Majo Monroe is a deceased witch who was Momoko's teacher in America. She befriended Momoko when she was younger, teaching her English and bakery, before making her witch apprentice after being discovered and turned into a magical frog. She eventually died due to illness, leaving Momoko with an earring. She is based on actress Marilyn Monroe.

 
 
 The head pastry chef of the Witch World, who is Majo Monroe's identical twin sister as they were born from the same rose.

 
 
 Majo Sloan is the director of the Witch Museum, who used to go on many adventures.

 
 
 The mayor of a village for magical frogs, who is hiding the fact she became a magical frog herself.

 
 Majo Ran is Majo Heart's foster daughter, who doesn't like to rely on magic.

 
 
Majo Tourbillon was once the queen of the Witch World, who left her throne to marry a human, but in the end the longevity gap between humans and the witch created a gap between her and her grandchildren. This left her with distrust in humans and she became enveloped in sadness, sealing off the two worlds and placing a curse.

Fairies
 
 
 Lala is Majo Rika's fully-grown fairy.

       
 The personal fairies of Doremi, Hazuki, Aiko, Onpu, Momoko, Hana, and Pop respectively, which they each received after passing their Level 2 Apprentice examinations. They have similar personalities to their owners and can transform into their appearance, generally to substitute for their owners to avoid suspicion, but they are only able to say their names. They can also be used to operate certain devices, during which they take a more mature form.

 
 
 Hehe is Majo Ruka's fully grown fairy and the opposite of Lala, whom she doesn't get along with because she calls Lala "old".

 
 
 Baba is the personal fairy of the former queen Majo Tourbillon who resides inside of a magical chest. She serves as the main clue about the items needed to awaken Majo Tourbillon from her slumber. She quickly gains a fondness for cola, often demanding it before sharing any information.

Wizards
 
 
 Oyajide is a thief from the Wizard World and the main antagonist of Ojamajo Doremi Sharp. For his actions, he was trapped inside a notebook PC and forced to help the Ojamajos track down bad cards. Afterwards, Oyajide is forced to work part-time at the Witch World's kindergarten, as punishment for his actions. He has two main forms: one being a suave human form, and the other being a small onion-like creature.

    
 
 A group of young wizards collectively known as Flat 4, who are tasked with trying to capture Hana during the second season. They tried to flirt with Doremi, Hazuki, Aiko and Onpu during the mission, and in the end they really love with these girls (especially Akatsuki with Doremi).

Others
 
 
 Pao is mysterious white flying elephant who Hana befriends in the fourth season. When Hana uses an accordion that was found around her neck, she can suck up the darkness caused by the thorns that had trapped Majo Tourbillon.

Human World

Misora Elementary School

Teachers
  Miss Cooper
 
 Ms. Seki is Doremi's homeroom teacher.
  Miss Shannon
 
 Ms. Yuki is the school nurse, who has helped students from all across the world. At the end of the fourth season, she is revealed to be the true identity of the Queen of the Witch World.

 
 
 Yuka Nishizawa is the homeroom teacher of class 5-2 and 6-2 in Ojamajo Doremi Motto and Ojamajo Doremi Dokkaan respectively.

  Principal Hamburg
 
 The school's principal.

  Vice Principal Shoople
 
 The strict vice principal.

 
 
 Ms. Hinako is Pop's homeroom teacher during elementary school.

Class 1 (in 5th and 6th grades)

Former Class 1 (in 3rd and 4th grades)
 Takuro Hagiwara (萩原たくろう Hagiwara Takurō) is a boy who plays guitar as his father, Tetsuro Hagiwara, was a member of a rock band Evergreen.
 Takeshi Hasebe (長谷部たけし Hasebe Takeshi) is Mutsumi's old friend.
 Ichiro Hirano (平野いちろう Hirano Ichirō) is a student in Misora Elementary.
 Koji Ito (伊藤こうじ Itō Kōji) is Kotake's good friend.
 Hajime Kikuchi (菊池はじめ Kikuchi Hajime) is a boy who loves railways. Hajime was once worried by the fact he does not have a dream for his future.
 Hiroko Kine (木根ひろこ Kine Hiroko) is a girl with a strong sense of justice.
 Junji Manda (万田じゅんじ Manda Junji) is the younger brother of Manda twins.
 Miho Maruyama (丸山みほ Maruyama Miho) is one of Doremi's classmates. Gifted in the visual arts, Miho draws a manga based on a story by Nobuko. Although she often conflicts with Aiko over her close friendship with Nobuko, Aiko helps her overcome her apparent inferiority complex.
 Sora Miyamae (宮前空 Miyamae Sora) is a student in Misora Elementary. He built a human-powered airplane called Stay Gold, inspired by the book of the same name.
 Dai Morikawa (森川だい Morikawa Dai) is a boy who loves cycling.
 Kayoko Nagato (長門かよこ Nagato Kayoko) is a girl suffering from school refusel who refused to attend school because of her scolionophobia (fear of school), which was prompted by being bullied on some occasions.
 Masayoshi Nakajima (中島正義 Nakajima Masayoshi) is a son of a policeman. Masayoshi ran away from his home a few times, but he respects his father deep inside.
 Kenji Ogura (小倉けんじ Ogura Kenji) is part of the comedy duo Toyoken with Toyokazu.
 Kotaro Okajima (岡島小太郎 Okajima Kotarō) is a boy who practices kendō.
 Masato Rinno (林野まさと Rinno Masato) is the smart yet arrogant son of a doctor.
 Natsumi Sato (佐藤なつみ Satō Natsumi) is a daughter of a family running the Christian church. She is Nobuaki's good friend, although their families suffer from a persistent conflict.
 Keiko Yamamoto (山本けいこ Yamamoto Keiko) is a serious book officer, who later learns to be more flexible.

Former Class 2 (in 3rd and 4th grades)
 Itoko Hamada (浜田いとこ Hamada Itoko) / Juliet Kojuro is a girl who is good at taking care of babies.
 Tetsuya Kotake (小竹哲也 Kotake Tetsuya) / Todd Washington is a childhood friend of Doremi who often calls her "Dojimi". Around other boys, they see him as a leader. He confesses his feelings to Doremi in the last episode of Dokkan.
 Mutsumi Kudo (工藤むつみ Kudō Mutsumi) / Melissa is a girl who loves wrestling.
 Nanako Okada (岡田ななこ Okada Nanako) / Autumn Harrison is a girl who refuses to take care of the school's animals because she once lost her beloved dog named Lulu. After the students learn about her past, Hazuki helps her overcome her trauma.
 Naomi Okuyama (奥山なおみ Okuyama Naomi) Gia is an athletic girl who is often ridiculed by boys because of her tall stature.
 Kaori Shimakura (島倉かおり Shimakura Kaori) / Penny is a school newspaper reporter wearing glasses and who always bears a camera.
 Toyokazu Sugiyama (杉山豊和 Sugiyama Toyokazu) / Stewart is wannabe comedian who always makes jokes. He is a member of SOS Trio in the 3rd and 4th grades, as well as Toyoken in the 5th and 6th grades.
 Reika Tamaki (玉木麗香 Tamaki Reika) / Josie Huffington is a rich girl with a very big ego. She often quarrels with Doremi and others.
 / Justin Bailey is Hazuki's childhood friend who appears to be quiet and loves playing the trumpet. Although Yada seems quite poor at handling social situations (something that improves as the series progresses), he is a kind-hearted person. This becomes more evident when Shiori has a serious disease, and he practices a new song for her to help her recover more quickly. Surprisingly, he is well aware of his special relationship with Hazuki, which appears to be somewhere between friends and lovers. Hazuki teaches him the "Majorika" chant to help him mount his courage.
 / Belinda Higgins is a girl who likes to fabricate tall tales, but her classmates do not usually mind because they are used to it. She writes a fictitious series about a detective called , whose name is based on her own.

Class 2 (in 5th and 6th grades)

Former Class 1 (in 3rd and 4th grades)
 Kenta Iizuka (飯塚けんた Iizuka Kenta) is a boy who attempts to escalate Mount Fuji by bicycle with Kotake and some of the other students.
 Sachiko Ijuuin (伊集院さちこ Ijūin Sachiko) is a model student. Because both of her parents are teachers, she always tries to be a good child, though severely restricting herself in the process.
 Noriko Kano (加納のり子 Kanō Noriko) is a sober girl who surprises Reika with her breasts.
 Yuko Koyama (小山ゆうこ Koyama Yūko) likes to volunteer and can use sign language.
 Yoko Manda (万田ようこ Manda Yōko) is the older twin of Junji who likes to make model aircraft.
 Aya Matsushita (松下あや Matsushita Aya) is the daughter of a family who runs a sushi restaurant.
 Jun Sato (佐藤じゅん Satō Jun) is a boy who becomes a member of SOS Trio in Season 3 after Sugiyama left to join Toyoken.
 Manabu Takagi (高木まなぶ Takagi Manabu): A tall boy who is one of the baseball club members.
 Yukari Umeno (梅野ゆかり Umeno Yukari) is the daughter of a family who runs a public inn.
 Mint Wada (和田みんと Wada Minto) is a girl who does not get along well with Aiko.
 Kazuya Yoshida (吉田かずや Yoshida Kazuya) is an attention seeker who often gets Nishizawa-sensei into trouble. His father runs a taiyaki store.

Former Class 2 (in 3rd and 4th grades)
 Kota Amano (天野こうた Amano Kōta) / Keith Lennon is a boy who loves Tokusatsu series, Battle Ranger.
 Shino Hanada (花田志乃 Hanada Shino) / Carey Wilson is a foreign-grown girl who often receives culture shocks from living in Japan.
 Ryota Hayashi (林りょうた Hayashi Ryōta) / Peter is a boy who loves monster series.
 Maki Higuchi (樋口まき Higuchi Maki) / Shannon Marley is a girl who is good at rollerblading and supports her brother.
 Kanae Iida (飯田かなえ Iida Kanae) / Haley is the daughter of a family who runs a steak house.
 Takao Kimura (木村たかお Kimura Takao) / David is one of Kotake's good friends.
 Marina Koizumi (小泉まりな Koizumi Marina) / Amanda is a girl who loves flowers and takes care of them.
 Masaharu Miyamoto (宮本まさはる Miyamoto Masaharu) / Scooter is very bright boy and one of the top students in his class. Masaharu never seems to come in "first" at anything, prompting him to run against Tamaki in the class elections, which he subsequently wins.
 / Nicholas Schmorff is a computer geek who idolizes Onpu.
 / Suzie Williams is a girl who appears sparingly throughout the series due to illness.
 Yutaka Ota (太田ゆたか Ōta Yutaka) / Oliver is a member of SOS Trio.
 Yuji Sagawa (佐川ゆうじ Sagawa Yūji) / Simon is a member of SOS Trio with short stature who has an inferiority complex to Naomi.
 Shota Taniyama (谷山将太 Taniyama Shōta) / Phillip Taniyama is a boy who is good at shōgi.
 Michiaki Watabe (渡部みちあき Watabe Michiaki) / Mackenzie is a boy who is skilled at magic.
 Nobuaki Yamauchi (山内信秋 Yamauchi Nobuaki) / Steven Yamauchi is a son of the Buddhist temple Yamauchi-dera. He is Natsumi's old friend, although their families suffer from a persistent conflict. In Episode 30, Doremi and classmates go to Nobuaki's temple for a sleepover where they listen to scary stories.
 Susumu Yanagida (柳田すすむ Yanagida Susumu) / Hanson is a boy who loves agepan.

The main characters' family
 Keisuke Harukaze (春風渓介 Harukaze Keisuke) / Mr. Goodwyn (voiced by Dan Green (English)) is Doremi and Pop's father. A fishing writer.
 Haruka Harukaze (春風はるか Harukaze Haruka) / Mrs. Goodwyn (voiced by Erica Schroeder) is Doremi and Pop's mother. 
 Akira Fujiwara (藤原明 Fujiwara Akira) / George Griffith (voiced by Tom Wayland (English)) is Hazuki's father. A film director.
 Reiko Fujiwara (藤原麗子 Fujiwara Reiko) / Mrs. Griffith is Hazuki's mother. A lady from a rich family.
 Baaya (ばあや), real name Koyuki Ichikawa (市川小雪 Ichikawa Koyuki) / Miss Suki is the Fujiwara family's housekeeper and nanny to Hazuki.
 Koji Senoo (妹尾幸治 Seno Kōji) / Mr. Haywood is Aiko's father. A taxi driver.
 Atsuko Okamura (岡村あつこ Okamura Atsuko) / Miriam Haywood is Aiko's mother. A caregiver.
 Tsuyoshi Segawa (瀬川剛 Segawa Tsuyoshi) / Mr. Craft is Onpu's father. A tram driver.
 Miho Segawa (瀬川美保 Segawa Miho) / Mrs. Craft is Onpu's mother. A former idol, she is now Onpu's manager.
 Kenzo Asuka (飛鳥健三 Asuka Kenzō) is Momoko's father. An architect.
 Minori Asuka (飛鳥みのり Asuka Mimori) is Momoko's mother. A photographer.

Others
  is originally the captain and often premier soccer player at Misora Elementary, he returns in later series as a coach due to an injury. Though often the subject of Doremi's infatuation (unbeknownst to him), he develops a relationship with Maki Takahashi, the soccer team's oft-reserved manager.
  is Aiko's childhood friend from Osaka and claimed her fiancé.
  (voiced by Kumiko Watanabe) is a mysterious girl who only appears in the last episode of Ojamajo Doremi Naisho to visit Doremi, who is revealed to be her future granddaughter that traveled through time using magic.

References 

Lists of anime and manga characters
Characters
Magical girl anime and manga characters